Siege of Venlo may refer to:

Siege of Venlo (1373)
Siege of Venlo (1459)
Siege of Venlo (1473)
Siege of Venlo (1478)
Siege of Venlo (1480)
Siege of Venlo (1499)
Siege of Venlo (1511)
Siege of Venlo (1543)
Siege of Venlo (1572)
Siege of Venlo (1579)
Siege of Venlo (1586)
Siege of Venlo (1593)
Venlo Treason
Siege of Venlo (1606)
Siege of Venlo (1632)
Siege of Venlo (1637)
Siege of Venlo (1646)
Siege of Venlo (1701)
Siege of Venlo (1702)
Siege of Venlo (1793)
Siege of Venlo (1830)